Amorphoscelis subnigraa is a species of praying mantis found in Borneo.

References

Amorphoscelis
Invertebrates of Borneo
Insects described in 1933